Hans Heinrich von Twardowski (5 May 1898 – 19 November 1958) was a German film actor.

Career in Germany
Twardowski was born in Stettin, Germany (now Szczecin in Poland). He made his first film appearance in the 1920 Robert Wiene-directed horror movie Das Cabinet des Dr. Caligari (The Cabinet of Dr. Caligari) which starred Conrad Veidt, Werner Krauss and Lil Dagover. He would go on to appear in over 20 movies in Weimar Germany during the 1920s. In 1921, Twardowski portrayed Joshua Nesbitt, Lord Horatio Nelson's stepson, in Lady Hamilton. Twardowski appeared in Der Falsche Dimitri and Es leuchtet meine Liebe the following year.

In 1927, Twardowski appeared in Die Weber (The Weavers) about man fighting against machines. The following year, he appeared in the Fritz Lang thriller Spione (Spies). A year later, he portrayed Otto von Wittelsbach, younger brother of Mad King Ludwig II, in Ludwig der Zweite, König von Bayern (Ludwig II, King of Bavaria). His first sound movie was Der König von Paris (The King of Paris) in 1930. His last movie in Germany was 1931's Der Herzog von Reichstadt.

Emigration to Hollywood 
Twardowski, a homosexual, left the turbulent Germany shortly before the Nazi regime took power. Afterwards, he appeared in the 1932 drama Scandal for Sale starring Pat O'Brien. In 1933; he played Von Bergen in the war drama Private Jones, a prince in Adorable and a lawyer in The Devil's in Love.
             
The following year, Twardowski played Ivan Shuvalov in The Scarlet Empress. In 1935, Twardowski appeared as Count Nicholas of Hungary in the Cecil B. DeMille film The Crusades starring Loretta Young. It would be two years before Twardowski appeared in another movie and that was a small part in the romance Thin Ice starring Sonja Henie and Tyrone Power. Because of the time he spent directing and appearing in plays on stage, it would be another two years before he worked in another movie.
              
In 1939, Twardowski's career picked up as he appeared in two Warner Bros. anti-Nazi movies. He played Max Helldorf in the spy thriller Confessions of a Nazi Spy. Next Twardowski appeared in another spy thriller Espionage Agent starring Joel McCrea which was released just three weeks after Germany invaded Poland.
               
Later in 1939, Twardowski appeared in the highly controversial anti-Nazi movie Hitler - Beast of Berlin. Twardowski plays Albert Stahlhelm, a Stormtrooper of the Waffen-SS, who becomes disillusioned with the brutality of the Nazi regime. His character accidentally betrays his anti-Nazi friends to his fellow SS members, who in turn murder him.
               
With the outbreak of World War II and the subsequent increase in war movies, Twardowski received uncredited roles as Nazis. He portrayed storm troopers, U-boat captains, and army officers. He appeared in seven films in 1942, including a large role as Captain Gemmler in the Nazi spy thriller Dawn Express. He next played an uncredited role as a sergeant in The Pied Piper starring Monty Woolley as an Englishman trying to get out of German-occupied France with a group of children. He also appeared in the comedy Joan of Ozark. Twardowski appeared as a German soldier in Desperate Journey with Errol Flynn and Ronald Reagan. He received a bit part as a U-boat captain in RKO's The Navy Comes Through starring Pat O'Brien. He had another big part in the comedy Once Upon a Honeymoon starring Cary Grant and Ginger Rogers.

In 1942, Twardowski, appeared in a small role in Casablanca playing a German officer. In 1943, Twardowski appeared in Lang's Hangmen Also Die!, portraying the notorious Nazi SS Commandant Reinhard Heydrich. All of his lines in this movie were in German. Twardowski played a German officer in Raoul Walsh's Background to Danger starring George Raft, Sydney Greenstreet and Peter Lorre. This was followed by a bit part as a Nazi captain in the war drama First Comes Courage. Twardowski appeared in The Strange Death of Adolf Hitler. Later that year, he had a small part in the war drama The Cross of Lorraine starring Gene Kelly, Cedric Hardwicke and Lorre.
              
Twardowski's last two movies were 1944 war dramas; first he appeared as a doctor in The Hitler Gang and later as a German Red Cross representative in Resisting Enemy Interrogation.

Stage career 
Twardowski's acting career ended along with World War II. However, he continued to write and direct plays. He originally starred on stage as the Dauphin in Schiller's productions of Die Jungfrau von Orleans. In the 1930s, Twardowski directed and appeared in the stage productions of The Brothers Karamazov and Old Heidelberg in the Pasadena Playhouse. In 1939, he wrote and produced a play in Brooklyn's St. Felix Street Playhouse titled Shakespeare Merchant - 1939, based on Shakespeare's The Merchant of Venice. Twardowski also sang tenor in a number of musicals.

After his retirement from movies, Twardowski worked again as a stage actor.

Personal life and death 
Twardowski was in a relationship with fellow German actor Martin Kosleck from the early 1930s until his death. He was a close friend of Marlene Dietrich. Twardowski died from a heart attack in his New York City apartment on 19 November 1958 at age 60.

Selected filmography

 Unheimliche Geschichten (1919) - Restaurant Waiter (2nd story) (uncredited)
 From Morn to Midnight (1920) - Sohn der Dame
 Baccarat (1919)
 Gerechtigkeit (1920)
 The Cabinet of Dr. Caligari (1920) - Alan
 Genuine (1920) - Florian
 The Night of Queen Isabeau (1920) - Page
 The House on the Moon (1921)
 Am Webstuhl der Zeit (1921) - Fanatiker
 The Rats (1921)
 Lady Hamilton (1921) - Joshua Nesbitt, Nelsons Stiefsohn
 Marizza (1922) - Antonino
 Tingeltangel (1922) - Frank
 Phantom (1922) - Hugo Lubota
 Es leuchtet meine Liebe (1922) - Lucien, Herzog von Eramont
 The False Dimitri (1922)
 Tabitha, Stand Up (1922)
 Lola Montez, the King's Dancer (1922) - Studiosus Friedemann
 I.N.R.I. (1923) - Johannes
 Leap Into Life (1924) - Geiger
 The Enchantress (1924)
 The Fire Dancer (1925) - Bartos, sein Freund
 Herbstmanöver (1926)
 Fadette (1926)
 The Weavers (1927) - Gottfried Hilse, sein Sohn
 Arme kleine Sif (1927)
 Die heilige Lüge (1927) - Janus
 Night of Mystery (1927)
 The False Prince (1927) - Wolf, sein Freund
 Die Hölle der Jungfrauen (1928) - Franek
 Spies (1928) - Vincent - Jason's Secretary (uncredited)
 Sex in Chains (1928) - Alfred
 I Kiss Your Hand, Madame (1929) - Waiter (uncredited)
 Peter the Mariner (1929) - Adolf Angel
 Ludwig II, King of Bavaria (1930) - Otto von Wittelsbach
 The King of Paris (1930)
 The Singing City (1930) - Willi von Wellheim - Claires Verehrer
 The Sacred Flame (1931)
 Men Behind Bars (1931) - Oliver
 Der Herzog von Reichstadt (1931)
 Scandal for Sale (1932) - Affner - the Pilot
 Six Hours to Live (1932) - Flosky (uncredited)
 Private Jones (1933) - Von Bergen (uncredited)
 Adorable (1933) - The Prince of Pontevedro
 The Devil's in Love (1933) - Andre's Defense Counsel (uncredited)
 The Scarlet Empress (1934) - Ivan Shuvolov
 Storm Over the Andes (1935) - Oberto
 The Crusades (1935) - Nicholas - Count of Hungary
 Alas sobre El Chaco (1935) - Oberto
 Thin Ice (1937) - Baron's Secretary (uncredited)
 Confessions of a Nazi Spy (1939) - Helldorf
 Espionage Agent (1939) - Dr. Helm
 Hitler - Beast of Berlin (1939) - Albert Stalhelm - Storm Trooper
 The Dawn Express (1942) - Capt. Gemmler
 The Pied Piper (1942) - Sergeant (uncredited)
 Joan of Ozark (1942) - Hans
 Enemy Agents Meet Ellery Queen (1942) - Capt. Earhardt (uncredited)
 Desperate Journey (1942) - German Soldier (uncredited)
 The Navy Comes Through (1942) - U-boat Captain (uncredited)
 Once Upon a Honeymoon (1942) - German Officer (uncredited)
 Casablanca (1942) - German Officer with Yvonne (uncredited)
 Margin for Error (1943) - Fritz - Butler (uncredited)
 Hangmen Also Die! (1943) - Reinhard Heydrich
 Hitler's Madman (1943) - Lt. Buelow (uncredited)
 Background to Danger (1943) - German Officer (uncredited)
 First Comes Courage (1943) - Nazi Captain (uncredited)
 The Strange Death of Adolf Hitler (1943) - Judge
 The Cross of Lorraine (1943) - German Officer in Car (uncredited)
 Passage to Marseille (1944) - French Airfield Radio Man (uncredited)
 The Hitler Gang (1944) - Department Doctor (uncredited)
 Resisting Enemy Interrogation (1944) - Herr Mahler - German Red Cross Representative (uncredited)

References

External links
 
 
 
 
 
 

1898 births
1958 deaths
Actors from Szczecin
German male film actors
German male silent film actors
German gay actors
People from the Province of Pomerania
Emigrants from Nazi Germany to the United States
20th-century German male actors
20th-century LGBT people